QueensPlaza is an upmarket shopping centre located in Central Business District of Brisbane, Queensland, Australia, with frontages on Adelaide Street, Queen Street Mall, and Edward Street.

Construction began in September 2003. Stage 1 of QueensPlaza was completed in June 2005, with stage 2 being completed in October 2007.  Stage 2 included giving the building more footage on the Adelaide Street side for more stores. The final stage, an expansion of David Jones, was opened in February 2008.

Car parking is available at five basement levels.

Fashion shows are held annually in the QueensPlaza as part of the Mercedes-Benz Fashion Festival Brisbane.

Queens Plaza gallery

See also

List of shopping centres in Australia

References

External links
Queens Plaza home page

Shopping centres in Brisbane
Shopping malls established in 2005
Brisbane central business district